Claude-Louis Masquelier, Masquelier fils or Masquelier the Younger (March 1781 – 5 April 1851) was a French lithographer and engraver. He was born in Paris, where he also died. He studied under his father Louis-Joseph Masquelier.

Sources

Engravers from Paris
1781 births
1851 deaths
19th-century French lithographers
19th-century French male artists
18th-century French engravers
19th-century French engravers
18th-century French male artists